Mauro Checcoli (born 1 March 1943) is an Italian equestrian and Olympic champion from Bologna. He won an individual gold medal in eventing at the 1964 Summer Olympics in Tokyo. He was also a member of the Italian team that received a gold medal in team eventing at the same Olympics.

References

External links
 

1943 births
Living people
Sportspeople from Bologna
Olympic equestrians of Italy
Italian male equestrians
Equestrians at the 1964 Summer Olympics
Equestrians at the 1968 Summer Olympics
Equestrians at the 1984 Summer Olympics
Olympic gold medalists for Italy
Olympic medalists in equestrian
Italian event riders
Medalists at the 1964 Summer Olympics